Cathy Walter, née Caudle (born c. 1961) is a Canadian former curler.

Awards
STOH All-Star Team: .

Teams

References

External links
 
 

Living people
Canadian women curlers
Curlers from Nova Scotia
Canadian women's curling champions
Curlers from Saskatchewan
1960s births